Below is a list of mayors of The Hague since it was decided in 1824 that only one mayor at a time would govern the city.

List

1824–1956

1957–present

See also
 Timeline of The Hague

References

The Hague